The 42nd edition of the Vuelta a Colombia was held from March 31 to April 12, 1992. There were a total number of 93 competitors, including 20 foreign riders. The race started in Pereira.

Stages

1992-03-31: Pereira — Pereira (5.2 km)

1992-04-01: Pereira — Palmira (196 km)

1992-04-02: Cali — Popayán (138.4 km)

1992-04-03: Popayán — Buga (203.1 km)

1992-04-04: Buga — Génova (163.5 km)

1992-04-05: Armenia — Manizales (151.2 km)

1992-04-06: Manizales — Medellín (199.3 km)

1992-04-07: Rionegro — La Dorada (205.8 km)

1992-04-08: Honda — Ibagué (141 km)

1992-04-09: Ibagué — Bogotá (211 km)

1992-04-10: Cajicá — Duitama (173.1 km)

1992-04-11: Paipa — Tunja (43 km)

1992-04-12: Tunja — Bogotá (144.2 km)

Final classification

Teams 

Manzana Postobón

Seguros Amaya (Spain)

Kelme (Spain)

Gaseosas Glacial

Coors Light (United States)

Cadafé

Pony Malta-Avianca

Manzana Postobón Aficionado

Agua Natural Glacial

Lotería de Boyacá-Aguardiente Líder

Pinturas Rust Oleum

References 
 

Vuelta a Colombia
Colombia
Vuelta Colombia